Pullenia may refer to:
 Pullenia (plant), a genus of flowering plants in the family Fabaceae
 Pullenia (foraminifera), a genus of foraminifers in the family Nonionidae